Vertical patrol is a form of patrol involving posting officers on different floors in buildings simultaneously.

This technique is known to be used by:

 Chicago Housing Authority Police Department (defunct)
 New York City Police Department Housing Bureau

See also
 Shooting of Akai Gurley

External links
 Inside look at NYPD ‘vertical patrols’ through gun-ridden housing project
 NYPD Sued Over Housing Project "Vertical Patrols"

References

Law enforcement techniques